Misr American College (MAC) a private Egyptian school based in Maadi, Cairo. This school was established in 2001. The curriculum  follows  American education, provided by the Massachusetts regulations, from Pre-K to Grade 12 and is accredited by the CITA board of education and the Ministry of Education in Egypt.

Established in 2001, MAC is catering mainly Egyptian students from nursery to 12th grade, backed by the full accreditation of the AdvancED.

About MAC
 Misr American College, (M.A.C.) is the American division of Orouba Language School.
Established in 2001, M.A.C. is the Rashidy's family's latest addition in their quest for educational excellence in Egypt. ·        
Misr American College provides the American curriculum from the Massachusetts regulations to all students starting from Pre-K to 12th grade.·        
The language of instruction is "Standard Edited American English" (SEAE), although MAC also follows the Egyptian Ministry of Education in the following three subjects: Arabic language, Arabic Social Studies and Religion (Islam and Christianity).·        
MAC school is located in the New Maadi neighborhood of Cairo and it is fully accredited by AdvancED, the largest accrediting organization worldwide.
Assignments are posted on on.mac-eg.com for students to browse at home.

History
The founding family, the Rashidy, has been in the field of education for over 50 years.  ·        
In 1960, Mr. Hussein ElRashidy initiated the Orouba educational institutions with Orouba Language School in Dokki neighborhood      
In 1996 the Rashidy family was among the first to start a private university in Egypt, Misr International University.·        
In 2001, the American division (M.A.C.) was founded in New Maadi.

Campus activities and events
Each year M.A.C. organizes many on-campus activities and events which are designed to serve as community building activities and as means of further communication between students, parents and teachers in a relaxed and supportive environment within the campus grounds. We view participation in extra-curricular activities and events as an important component of communication and relationship building. Here is a list of some of our on-campus activities and events:

Academics 
Elementary School:  Nursery – Grade 5.·       
Middle school:  Grades 6–9.·        
High School:  Grades 10–12.

Students are obliged to take all classes until senior year, when they're allowed to pick or drop subjects based on their aimed-for faculty. Mentors from MIU have individual parents' meeting in order to guide the student and the parent into this process.

A new mandatory course, Personal, Social and Health Education, has been added. This program, also referred to as the Building Pioneers Program, works to nurture the students minds and develop their social skills.

Student Support Services Center
This Learning Support Center (LSC) at MAC is responsible for receiving inquiries and special requests directly from parents. · Working with the school's counselor, administration team, and teachers, it makes sure to take corrective actions according to school regulations and policies.·

Also, after school tutoring and lunch tutoring is available for students to sign up for. Some students may be put under probation, which means they'll spend extra time with the teacher during free times in order to catch up.

An individual education plan (IEP) is developed for each of these students, indicating specific goals and objectives required to develop the student's individualized academic skills.·

Letters of concern are sent at the end of every semester, warning the parents of students at risk. Detention is also given for misconduct.

Facilities

Basic
 Six floors. ·        
 Smart boards·   
 Mosque·Room     
 10,000 square meter campus        
 Clinic (with full-time gazar)·        
 LSC (Learning Support Center)·        
 Air conditioned classrooms·        
 Three Playgrounds (Senior, Junior, Main)·        
 Transportation (air-conditioned, modern and comfortable buses)
 Three Canteens from where students buy lunch. Menus are posted there.

Studying areas
 Media and Technology center·        
 Two Art Labs (Junior and Senior)·   
 Two Computer Labs (Senior and Main)·        
 Two Libraries (Senior and Junior)·  
 Three Science Labs(Chemistry, Physics, Main) ·

Sporting facilities
 Two Soccer Fields on campus                                    
 Pass to Olympic Village of Maadi in which students practice in olympic football, volleyball, basketball, and handball courts during PE classes.

Extra-curricular activities' areas
 Ballet Area
 Photography Studio·
 Band and vocal music rehearsal and performance rooms·
 Clubs·
 Music Room
 Senior Lunch Area

School houses
From the beginning of the year, students are divided into four houses:
 Egypt Eagles
 Cairo Cobras
 Nile Crocodiles
 Desert Foxes
All of the students work to collect tokens for doing good deeds and exceptional work in class to be rewarded at the end of each month.

Activities

---> School Clubs
For club logos, please visit: http://site.mac-eg.com/clubs-2/
 Student Council
 Helping Hands
 Press Club    
 National Honor Society and National Junior Honor Society (Exclusive to Straight A students) 
 Forensics Club
 Hip Hop Club
 Choir Club      
 French Club
 Drama Club
 Science Club
 Instruments Club
 Book Club

All clubs are expected to have a public performance at the end of the semester. Once the semester ends and the club has demonstrated their work, students can either change the club they're in or stay and get a chance at competing with other schools or being promoted from Junior Member to Senior Member and finally, chief.

---> Off-Campus Trips: 
 Animania Zoo        
 Abdeen Palace        
 Dream Park        
 Paintball        
 Circus
 Kidzania         
 Fagnoon        
 Pharaonic Village        
 Sun Bird        
 The Ranch        
 Plein Air        
 Wadi Degla        
 Ain Sukhna        
 Sharm Sheikh        
 Barcelona (For Seniors)
 Paris (For Seniors)
 Rome (For Seniors)
 Gouna (For Soccer Team)

--> On-Campus Activities
 BBQ Day
 Hat Day
 Red Day
 Twin Day
 Art Week
 Green Day
 Book Week
 70's Party
 Pajama Day
 Sports Day
 Prom Party
 Health Week
 Art Carnival
 Thanksgiving
 Alumni Reunion
 Halloween Party
 Christmas Bazaar
 International Day
 Galabeya Day Party
 Cartoon Character Day
 Christmas Celebration
 Mother's Day Performance
 Fun Day (Last Day of School)

Staff

--> Administration:

 Mr Hussein El Rashidy : Director of the Board
 Eng Hussein H. El Rashidy : Director of Schools
 Mr Mike Pavlos : Superintendent
 Mr. Frank Smida : School Principal
 Dr. Azza Naguib : Deputy Principal
 Ms Iman Ahmed : Administration Manager
 Mr Steve Riddell : Coordinator of Student Affairs Middle & High Schools

Official videos 
 MAC Presentation: https://www.youtube.com/watch?v=M6ANipIVh18
 MAC Info Presentation:https://www.youtube.com/watch?v=vFUXTxX-Bvg

Road to the States Championship
The boys compete in the Road to the States Championship for soccer.

2011–12:
In El Gouna for the championship, MAC's boys played against 
 ACC and lost 3 to 1.
 Elite School and won 4 to 2.
 El Hayat Academy and tied 1 to 1.

This match qualified Misr American College's soccer team into the semi-finals.

 Alsson and lost 3 to 1.
 Narmer School and tied

MAC ended up winning third place in the whole tournament. 
www.roadtothestates.com

2013–14:
The boys competed in el Gouna for the Road to the States Competition.
They received 2nd in the whole competition after beating all teams except for El Hayat Academy.

References

External links 
 

http://www.mac-eg.com/

Private schools in Cairo
Education in Cairo
Educational institutions established in 2001
2001 establishments in Egypt